Rollo and the Spirit of the Woods (also titled Rolli) is a 2001 Finnish fantasy film directed by Olli Saarela. It is the second film based on the television series Rölli, the first being Rölli – hirmuisia kertomuksia (1991).

Plot 
Hairy and rowdy trolls called rolleys sail to a land inhabited by more peace-loving elves. When the rolleys arrive to the elf village, they scare the elves away and settle down in the village. One of the elves, Milli, a brave elf girl, returns to the village to make a peace with the rolleys. The rolleys do not warm to Milli's peace proposal, but she becomes friends with a rolley called Rölli. It becomes their mission to solve the conflict between the elves and the rolleys.

Cast 
 Allu Tuppurainen as Rölli
 Maria Järvenhelmi as Milli Menninkäinen
 Peter Franzén as Lakeija
 Kari Hietalahti as Riitasointu
 Jussi Lampi as Iso
 Kalle Holmberg as Vaakamestari
 Samuli Edelmann as the elder of the elf village
 Jorma Tommila as the elder of the Rolley tribe

References

External links 
 

Finnish fantasy films
Finnish children's films
2000s children's fantasy films
Films directed by Olli Saarela
Films shot in Finland
Films scored by Tuomas Kantelinen
Films about trolls
Finnish sequel films